Darren Ramsammy is a Canadian cricketer. He played a single ODI for Canada during the World Cricket League. He had also represented Canada at under 19s level previously.

References

External links
 

1992 births
Canadian cricketers
Living people
Wicket-keepers